Maazii is an Indian bollywood film, directed by Jaideep Chopra and produced by Jaideep Chopra & Narendra Singh. The title Maazii is an Urdu word meaning "the past".

Cast
Sumeet Nijhawan as Tarun Singh
Mona Wasu as Shrishti Singh
Manish Chaudhary as Gulab Singh
Pankaj Tripathi as Satinder Rathi
Mohammed Zeeshan Ayyub as Ashfaq
Manav Kaushik as Satinder Bhati
Zakir Hussain as Mahinder Singh
Mukesh Rishi as Malhaan Singh
Ashok Banthia as Satbeer Singh
Devender Chaudhary as Rajinder Chaudhary
Mohit Chauhan as Sushil Jain
Pooja Bisht as Shanno
Saanvi Sharma as Minal
Vansh Chopra as Young Tarun

Plot
Maazii is essentially a thriller that travels from the hills of Mussoorie to the plains of western UP. It is a story about a couple Tarun (Sumit Nijhawan) and Shrishti (Mona Wasu) who have a near perfect relationship. However, by a twist of fate, an unfortunate accident occurs which brings Tarun's life into the limelight and turns him into a hero overnight.
The events that follow not only shatter the peaceful life of the family but also put them in grave danger. But when his daughter, Minal (Saanvi Sharma) is kidnapped at the hands of an unknown assailant, Tarun will stop at nothing to get her back safely. He must now return to his roots and find out who is wreaking havoc in his life and what is the motive behind it.

Trivia
This movie is a remake of the English movie A History of Violence (2005).

Filming
The first half of the film was shot in the scenic locations of Mussourie and Dehradun, and the second half was mostly shot in the rustic and raw locations of Meerut. The flashback portion of the film was filmed in Rao Raj Vilas fort of Jat Jagirdar of Kuchesar, near Meerut. The shooting was completed within the pre-decided schedule of 31 days from 29 October to 2 November 2012. The production budget was around Rs. Four Crores.

Release
The film was released across the country on 27 September 2013. However, being a debutorial venture without any big names attached to it, despite great critical acclaim, Maazii failed to get many screens. It was re-released in cinemas on 11 October 2013. In 2019, Maazii was released on Prime Video.

Critical acclaim
Despite being Jaideep Chopra's debut directorial, Maazii received good critical acclaim and his work as a director was appreciated. Renowned critic Subhash K. Jha, called it "the shocking surprise of the season." He also stated that Maazii "takes us back to the stylish thrillers of B.R. Chopra like Dhund and Ittefaq. Debutant Jaideep Chopra's film is well-crafted and thoughtfully scripted. It's an original idea executed in a gripping language. Worth a dekko for its suspenseful aura."

Rohit Vats from IBN7 gave Maazii a rating of 4/5 stars and was all praises for the film. He claimed that Maazii shows "a glimpse of the latent potential of the gangster genre" and was "not to be missed" India Today's Faheem Ruhani mentioned in his review that "Director Jaideep Chopra's debut directorial Maazii is that pleasant surprise which hits you once in a while."

"Maazii" was also listed as one of the 10 "small films/non-star cast films that made it big" in 2013 in an article in DNA newspaper.

Controversies
Despite good critic reviews, the film was not given many screens. In an interview, the producers of the film reported that several multiplex chains had demanded money in return for giving them shows. This led to a wave of controversy with several other producers and directors coming forward to claim that they had faced similar extortion at the hands of multiplex chains.

Music

The music score of the film was composed by the duo Faizan Hussain-Agnel Roman, Maazii being their first commercial film album. Faizan Hussain is the nephew of tabla maestro Ustad Zakir Hussain. Lyrics for the album were written by Swanand Kirkire and Arun Kumar. The preparation for the songs and selection of music started as early as May 2012. Recording of the songs began in October 2012.

The music album was launched on 30 August 2013.

Nominations and awards

References

External links
 
 

2010s Hindi-language films
2013 films
Indian remakes of American films
Films shot in Mussoorie
Films shot in Uttar Pradesh
Films shot in Uttarakhand